The Antibiotic Resistance Lab Network (ARLN) is a group of laboratories of the United States Centers for Disease Control and Prevention established to supplement the work of local and state public health laboratories in the identification and research of antibiotic resistance. It was created as part of the CDC's National Action Plan for Combating Antibiotic Resistant Bacteria.  The network is part of the National Center for Emerging and Zoonotic Infectious Diseases. Laboratories in this network cover seven regions and are located in Maryland, Minnesota, New York, Tennessee, Texas, Washington, and Wisconsin, as part of their state health departments.

Antibiotic resistance makes more than 2 million people per year sick. 23,000 people die each year from it.

One of the purposes of the ARLN is the identification of resistance mechanisms. Clinical samples are not routinely tested because it is not needed for patient-level decisions and insurance companies will not reimburse providers. Additionally, the ARLN will bank samples of bacteria containing resistance genes and make them available to researchers for further investigation.

References

Antimicrobial resistance organizations
Centers for Disease Control and Prevention